Bandar Khayran is a coastal town in northeastern Oman.

Populated places in Oman
Populated coastal places in Oman